Calvin Lawrence Booth (born May 7, 1976) is an American basketball executive and a former professional basketball player who currently serves as the general manager of the Denver Nuggets.

College career
Booth attended Penn State University after starring at Groveport Madison High School in Ohio. As a junior, he was named the Big Ten Defensive Player of the Year. As a senior, he was a second-team All-Big Ten Conference pick. He earned his Bachelor of Arts at Penn State in 1998.

NBA playing career
Booth was drafted by the Washington Wizards in the second round (35th overall) of the 1999 NBA draft. He played for the Wizards, the Dallas Mavericks, Seattle SuperSonics, Philadelphia 76ers, Milwaukee Bucks, Minnesota Timberwolves, and Sacramento Kings, averaging 3.3 points, 2.8 rebounds and 1.0 blocks per game. During the 2006–07 NBA season, he played for the Washington Wizards a second time, providing play from off the bench and starting occasionally.

On January 13, 2004, as a member of the Supersonics, Booth recorded a career-high 10 blocks in 17 minutes of playing time. He accompanied this with 2 points, 0 rebounds, 0 assists, and 0 steals. The Supersonics lost this game to the Cavaliers, 96–104.

In Game 5 of the 2001 NBA playoffs against the Utah Jazz, Booth made a layup with 9.8 seconds remaining to give Dallas a game-ending 84–83 lead and therefore a 3–2 series victory; this was the Mavericks' first winning playoff series since the 1988 Western Conference semifinals against Denver.

On September 10, 2007 Booth signed as a free agent with the Philadelphia 76ers.

Front office career
Booth started his front office career with the New Orleans Pelicans as a scout during the 2012–13 season. After one year there he moved to the Minnesota Timberwolves, working his way up to director of player personnel. On August 16, 2017, Booth was named assistant general manager of the Denver Nuggets. On July 7, 2020, Booth was named general manager of the Denver Nuggets.

NBA career statistics

Regular season

|-
| align="left" | 1999–00
| align="left" | Washington
| 11 || 0 || 13.0 || .348 || .000 || .714 || 2.9 || .6 || .3 || 1.3 || 3.8
|-
| align="left" | 2000–01
| align="left" | Washington
| 40 || 22 || 16.0 || .440 || .000 || .733 || 4.4 || .6 || .4 || 2.0 || 4.5
|-
| align="left" | 2000–01
| align="left" | Dallas
| 15 || 7 || 19.5 || .548 || .000 || .606 || 4.8 || 1.3 || .8 || 2.0 || 7.5
|-
| align="left" | 2001–02
| align="left" | Seattle
| 15 || 15 || 18.6 || .427 || .000 || .958 || 3.6 || 1.1 || .4 || .9 || 6.2
|-
| align="left" | 2002–03
| align="left" | Seattle
| 47 || 0 || 12.2 || .437 || .000 || .723 || 2.3 || .3 || .2 || .7 || 2.9
|-
| align="left" | 2003–04
| align="left" | Seattle
| 71 || 35 || 17.0 || .466 || .000 || .798 || 3.9 || .4 || .2 || 1.4 || 4.9
|-
| align="left" | 2004–05
| align="left" | Dallas
| 34 || 1 || 7.7 || .430 || .000 || .875 || 1.7 || .1 || .3 || .5 || 2.4
|-
| align="left" | 2004–05
| align="left" | Milwaukee
| 17 || 0 || 11.1 || .517 || .000 || .750 || 2.9 || .2 || .2 || .7 || 2.5
|-
| align="left" | 2005–06
| align="left" | Washington
| 33 || 2 || 7.6 || .426 || .500 || .556 || 1.6 || .4 || .3 || .3 || 1.4
|-
| align="left" | 2006–07
| align="left" | Washington
| 44 || 1 || 8.6 || .470 || .500 || .600 || 1.8 || .4 || .1 || .7 || 1.6
|-
| align="left" | 2007–08
| align="left" | Philadelphia
| 31 || 0 || 6.6 || .333 || .000 || .600 || 1.2 || .3 || .2 || .6 || .8
|-
| align="left" | 2008–09
| align="left" | Minnesota
| 1 || 0 || 1.0 || .000 || .000 || .000 || 1.0 || .0 || .0 || .0 || .0
|-
| align="left" | 2008–09
| align="left" | Sacramento
| 7 || 0 || 7.9 || .500 || .000 || .750 || 1.4 || .0 || .1 || .3 || 2.3
|- class="sortbottom"
| style="text-align:center;" colspan="2"| Career
| 366 || 83 || 12.2 || .451 || .222 || .748 || 2.8 || .4 || .3 || .9 || 3.3

Playoffs

|-
| align="left" | 2001
| align="left" | Dallas
| 10 || 0 || 13.7 || .405 || .000 || .889 || 2.8 || .2 || .7 || .6 || 3.8
|-
| align="left" | 2007
| align="left" | Washington
| 1 || 0 || 18.0 || .667 || .000 || .000 || 4.0 || 1.0 || 1.0 || .0 || 4.0
|- class="sortbottom"
| style="text-align:center;" colspan="2"| Career
| 11 || 0 || 14.1 || .425 || .000 || .889 || 2.9 || .3 || .7 || .6 || 3.8

See also

List of NCAA Division I men's basketball career blocks leaders
List of National Basketball Association players with 10 or more blocks in a game

References

External links
NBA.com biography of Calvin Booth

1976 births
Living people
African-American basketball players
American men's basketball players
Basketball players from Columbus, Ohio
Centers (basketball)
Dallas Mavericks players
Denver Nuggets executives
Goodwill Games medalists in basketball
Milwaukee Bucks players
Minnesota Timberwolves players
Penn State Nittany Lions basketball players
People from Reynoldsburg, Ohio
Philadelphia 76ers players
Power forwards (basketball)
Sacramento Kings players
Seattle SuperSonics players
Sportspeople from Columbus, Ohio
Washington Wizards draft picks
Washington Wizards players
Competitors at the 1998 Goodwill Games
Competitors at the 2001 Goodwill Games
21st-century African-American sportspeople
20th-century African-American sportspeople